Charton Christopher Frantz (born May 8, 1951) is an American musician and record producer.  He is the drummer for both Talking Heads and Tom Tom Club, both of which he co-founded with wife and Talking Heads bassist Tina Weymouth. In 2002, Frantz was inducted into the Rock and Roll Hall of Fame as a member of Talking Heads.

Career
Born in Fort Campbell, Kentucky, Charton Christopher Frantz graduated from Shady Side Academy in Pittsburgh, Pennsylvania. He studied in the early 1970s at the Rhode Island School of Design, where he met both David Byrne and Tina Weymouth. Byrne and Frantz formed a band called the Artistics, which went on to become Talking Heads, in 1973. Weymouth, then Frantz's girlfriend,  joined the band in 1975 after they had moved to New York City. Frantz and Weymouth were married in 1977 and have two sons.

Frantz and Weymouth formed Tom Tom Club in 1980, when Talking Heads went on hiatus due to Byrne's solo efforts. Weymouth, Frantz, and Jerry Harrison reunited as The Heads for a one-off album called No Talking, Just Head in 1996, featuring a rotating cast of vocalists, including Debbie Harry.

He and Weymouth produced the Happy Mondays' 1992 album, Yes Please! and the Scottish group Angelfish's self-titled album, in addition to producing multiple albums for Ziggy Marley and the Melody Makers. Frantz and Weymouth also contributed backing vocals and percussion for Gorillaz self-titled debut album.

He is ranked number 12 in Stylus Magazines list of the 50 greatest rock drummers and hosts a monthly radio program, "Chris Frantz the Talking Head", on 89.5 WPKN in Bridgeport, Connecticut.

Frantz and Weymouth are also closely associated with the Compass Point All Stars movement. After Phish covered Talking Heads' Remain in Light, Frantz become known as an influence on the modern jamband scene.

Frantz's memoir, Remain in Love: Talking Heads, Tom Tom Club, Tina, was published in July 2020 (St. Martin's Press in the US and Faber and Faber in the UK).

Health
On Memorial Day Weekend 2020, Frantz suffered a heart attack that required the insertion of three stents.

In March 2022, Frantz and Tina Weymouth were in a car collision with a drunk driver.

Bibliography

References

External links

 Caroline-up's Skype Interview w/Chris Frantz 2013/17/03
 Stay Thirsty's interview w/Chris Frantz
 Chris Frantz's Profile
 

1951 births
20th-century American drummers
American male drummers
American new wave musicians
American rock drummers
New wave drummers
Living people
People from Christian County, Kentucky
People from Fairfield, Connecticut
Rhode Island School of Design alumni
Rhode Island School of Design alumni in music
Rock musicians from Kentucky
Shady Side Academy alumni
Talking Heads members
Tom Tom Club members